The Digicel Jamaica Classic in association with Sony Ericsson was a senior (over 50s) men's professional golf tournament played on the Caribbean island of Jamaica. It was an early season event on the European Seniors Tour, played in 2003 to 2004. It was played on the Half Moon Golf Course, Montego Bay. The events had prize money of US$250,000 with the winner receiving $37,500.

Winners

External links
Coverage on the European Senior Tour's official site (2004)
Coverage on the European Senior Tour's official site (2003)

Former European Senior Tour events
Golf tournaments in Jamaica
Recurring sporting events established in 2003
Recurring sporting events disestablished in 2004